Uri Zohar (4 November 1935 – 2 June 2022) was an Israeli film director, actor and comedian who left the entertainment world to become an Orthodox rabbi.

Biography

Uri Zohar was born in Tel Aviv. His parents were Polish Jewish immigrants. In 1952, he graduated high school and did his military service in an army entertainment troupe. His first marriage, to singer Ilana Rovina, ended in divorce.

In 1960, he studied philosophy at the Hebrew University of Jerusalem. He was sentenced to three months of community service on charges of marijuana possession. In the late 1970s, under the influence of Yitzhak Shlomo Zilberman, Zohar turned to religion, becoming a Haredi Orthodox Jew and a rabbi.

He was a close friend of Arik Einstein, with whom he made some of his most noted films. Einstein’s two daughters married Zohar’s sons.

Zohar was one of the founding members of Ma'ale Amos. Later, he resided in Jerusalem.

He died at the age of 86 on 2 June 2022. He was survived by his second wife Eliya Shuster, a former actress who had participated in a film he directed, their seven children and numerous grandchildren.

Entertainment and film career

After his discharge from the army, Zohar became one of the founding members of the theatre and entertainment troupe Batzal Yarok, which was popular in the late 1950s and early 1960s. In the 1960s, Zohar directed and starred in Israeli films, among them Hole in the Moon, Three Days and a Child, Every Bastard a King, Big Eyes and Metzitzim. He directed 11 full-length films as well as a number of short movies and episodes of the television series "Lool" (Chicken Coop). When Israel Television went on air, he became a program host and appeared in commercials.

In 1977, he began wearing a kippa on the television game show he was hosting. He eventually withdrew entirely from Israel's popular culture scene to become a Haredi Jew and began to study in yeshiva. He became a rabbi in Jerusalem and immersed himself in Biblical scholarship. He became active in the movement to attract secular Jews to religious orthodoxy, and used his entertainment skills to promote this objective. In the 1992 Israeli elections, Zohar directed the television broadcasts for the Shas party. He later directed a film about a successful dancer who embraces Orthodox Judaism, mirroring his own story. The film was a success with Ultra-Orthodox audiences. Zohar had enlisted the help filmmmakers Dani Rosenberg and Yaniv Segalovich to make it, and Rosenberg and Segalovich in turn made a documentary about him.

When asked in an interview about how he regarded his former career in entertainment, Zohar said that "I respect it, the way a mature adult remembers his childhood. But there's no escaping the fact that I was a child."

Awards and recognition
In 1976 he was awarded the Israel Prize for cinema, which he declined.
In 2012, Cinémathèque Française in Paris held a retrospective of Zohar's work. The event included lectures and screenings of all his major films. Zohar was described as one of Israel's most interesting film directors due to his exploration of manhood and machismo, male-female relationships and the impact of the military.

Published works
 My Friends, We Were Robbed
 Waking Up Jewish

Filmography
 (1962)
Hole in the Moon (1964)
 (1966)
Three Days and a Child (1967)
Every Bastard a King (1968)
Hitromamut (1970)
The Hero (1971)
Metzitzim (1973)
Ha-Tarnegol (1973)
 (1974)
Hatzilu Et HaMatzil (1977)

See also
Cinema of Israel

References

External links 
 Excerpt from My Friends, We Were Robbed
  (in Hebrew)
 Uri Zohar: The Inventor of Modern Israeli Cinema
 Archived speeches on TorahAnytime.com
Uri Zohar on National Israel News

1935 births
2022 deaths
Male actors from Tel Aviv
Film people from Tel Aviv
Israeli male film actors
Israeli film directors
Israeli male comedians
Baalei teshuva
20th-century Israeli comedians
Orthodox Jewish outreach
Israeli people of Polish-Jewish descent
Israeli Orthodox Jews
Jews in Mandatory Palestine
Hebrew University of Jerusalem alumni
21st-century rabbis in Jerusalem